Schoenus apogon, known as common bog-rush, is a species of sedge native to eastern Australia, New Zealand and Japan. A tufted annual grass-like plant growing to 55 cm tall. Often seen in seasonally wet habitats. A species of variable form, which may include more than one taxon. The specific epithet apogon is derived from Greek, meaning "no beard".

References 

apogon
Plants described in 1817
Flora of New South Wales
Flora of Victoria (Australia)
Flora of Queensland
Flora of Japan
Flora of New Zealand